This is a list in alphabetical order of cricketers who have played for Moors Sports Club in top-class matches since it acquired first-class status in May 1989. Where there is an article, the link comes before the club career span, and the scorecard name (typically initials and surname) comes after. If no article is present, the scorecard name comes before the span.

A
 M. I. Abdeen (2000–01 to 2001–02)
 P. Abeygunasekera (1994–95 to 1997–98)
 Thamara Abeyratne (2001–02 to 2004–05) : W. T. Abeyratne
 I. C. Abeywansa (1991–92 to 1994–95)
 C. Ajireen (1997–98)
 Mahendra Amerasinghe (1995–96) : M. Amerasinghe
 H. P. T. P. Ananda (2013–14)
 M. W. K. Anjula (2019–20 to 2020)
 I. Anthony (1992–93)
 Sahan Adeesha (2016–17 to 2017–18) : W. S. A. Appuhami
 Sujith Ariyapala (1980–81 to 1990–91) : S. Ariyapala
 R. D. N. Ariyapperuma (1997–98 to 1998–99)
 A. R. M. Aroos (1983–84 to 1991–92)
 A. A. C. E. Athukorala (2010–11)
 Lahiru Attanayake (2018–19 to 2019–20) : A. M. L. H. Attanayake
 M. H. O. Azeez (1992–93 to 1995–96)
 M. I. I. Azeez (1990–91 to 1991–92)

J 

 Bandula Jagath (1995-1996)

M
 Suwanji Madanayake (2010–11) : S. Madanayake
 Danushka Madushanka (2015–16 to 2022–23) : P. B. D. U. Madushanka
 Kasun Madushanka (2010–11 to 2011–12) : H. U. K. Madushanka
 K. T. G. N. Madushanka (2012–13 to 2013–14)
 Promod Maduwantha (2016–17) : H. L. P. Maduwantha
 D. Maiarachchi (1999–2000)
 S. Makewita (1995–96)
 Nisham Mazahir (2007–08 to 2008–09) : M. N. Mazahir
 Sanitha de Mel (2014–15 to 2015–16) : V. S. R. de Mel 
 Kusal Mendis (2013–14) : B. K. G. Mendis
 B. M. A. J. Mendis (2020–21)
 B. M. S. N. Mendis (2001–02)
 Tharindu Mendis (2016–17) : B. M. T. T. Mendis
 M. T. T. Mirando (2016–17)
 Moeen Ali (2011–12) : Moeen Ali
 Mohammed Shamaaz (2019–20 to 2022–23) : Mohammed Shamaaz
 Umeshka Morais (2016–17) : U. A. Morais
 Chamikara Mudalige (2006–07 to 2008–09) : C. R. B. Mudalige
 Z. Muthalib (1991–92)

W
 Ramesh Mendis (2018–19 to 2022–23) : R. T. M. Wanigamuni

References

Moors Sports Club